Adolfo Franci (27 November 1895, in Florence – 31 January 1954, in Rome) was an Italian screenwriter. He was nominated for the Academy Award for Best Original Screenplay for his work in Shoeshine (1946).

Selected filmography
 The Gates of Heaven (1945)
 Shoeshine (1946)
 Eleonora Duse (1947)
 Heart (1948)

References

External links

Italian screenwriters
1895 births
Year of death missing
Italian male screenwriters